This is a list of artists who have been described as general purveyors of art pop. Individuals are alphabetized by surname.

A–M

N–Z

References

Bibliography
 
 
 

Art pop
Lists of musicians by genre